The 2018 FA Trophy Final was a football match between Brackley Town and Bromley on 20 May 2018. It was the final match of the 2017–18 FA Trophy, the 49th season of the FA Trophy. Both teams were making their first appearances in the final.

Route to the final

Brackley Town

Bromley

Match

Details

References

2018
Brackley Town F.C. matches
Bromley F.C. matches
2017–18 in English football
2018 sports events in London
Events at Wembley Stadium
May 2018 sports events in the United Kingdom
Association football penalty shoot-outs